Mexichromis lemniscata is a species of colourful sea slug or dorid nudibranch, a marine gastropod mollusk in the family Chromodorididae.

Distribution
This nudibranch was described from Port Louis, Mauritius. It is reported from the tropical Indo-Pacific Ocean including the Red Sea, Réunion, Thailand, Australia, Fiji, Moorea and the Phoenix Islands.

Description
Mexichromis lemniscata has a pale pink-red body, with a white and purple-lined mantle. There are three thick lines on its dorsum, coloured yellow-white-yellow respectively. The gills and rhinophores are covered with different coloured rings, from base to tip, white-red-purple-lilac.  This species is easily confused with other similarly coloured nudibranchs and shows considerable variation; it is likely to be an unresolved species complex.

Mexichromis lemniscata can reach a total length of at least 35 mm, and like all  Chromodorids, feeds on sponges.

References

Chromodorididae
Gastropods described in 1832